Vince Mendoza (born November 17, 1961) is an American composer, music arranger and conductor. He debuted as a solo artist in 1989, and is known for his work conducting the Metropole Orkest and WDR Big Band Köln, as well as arranging music for musicians such as John Scofield, Joni Mitchell, Michael Brecker and Björk. Over the course of his career, he has won seven Grammy Awards and one Latin Grammy Award and has been nominated for a total of 38 between the two awards.

Early life 

Mendoza was born in Norwalk, Connecticut in 1961, He began studying music on the piano and classical guitar at an early age, before changing his focus to playing the trumpet and composing in high school, due to his love of jazz and soul music. Mendoza wrote music for his high school jazz ensemble, later continuing studies in music composition at Ohio State University. Mendoza moved to Los Angeles in 1983, where he completed a master's degree in composition at USC Thornton School of Music.

Career

In Los Angeles, Mendoza began to make connections in the music industry, arranging music for television and recordings, and for artists such as Peter Erskine, Charlie Haden and Rickie Lee Jones. He was signed to Blue Note Records, with whom he released Start Here (1990) and Instructions Inside (1991). In 1992 he released Jazzpaña with American producer Arif Mardin in 1991, garnering his first Grammy Nomination for the song "Buleria". In 1994, Mendoza released a big band album called Sketches, collaborating with the WDR Big Band. In 1995, Mendoza began his work with the Dutch Metropole Orkest and was appointed the principal guest conductor in 1998. In 1999, Mendoza composed the music and conducted the London Symphony Orchestra to on his album Epiphany.

His compositions can be heard on recordings by Gary Burton, Pat Metheny, Sean Jones, Michael Brecker, John Abercrombie and Charlie Haden. Mendoza provided arrangements for Björk's Vespertine (2001) and Lars von Trier's score to Dancer in the Dark (2000). His arrangements are also heard on recordings by Gregory Porter, Chaka Khan, Elvis Costello, Robbie Williams, Robert Glasper, Bobby McFerrin, Sting, as well as Herbie Hancock and Al Jarreau. He has worked as an arranger, conductor, and/or producer on six Grammy Award-winning albums: Travelogue and Both Sides Now by Joni Mitchell; Some Skunk Funk by Randy Brecker and Michael Brecker; Brown Street by Joe Zawinul; 54 by the Metropole Orkest and John Scofield; and his own collaborative album with the Metropole Orkest, El Viento: The Garcia Lorca Project. From 2005 to 2013 he was chief conductor of the Dutch Metropole Orkest. He has also served as the guest conductor for the Los Angeles Philharmonic, the Hollywood Bowl Orchestra, and the New York Philharmonic, among others.

In 2021, Mendoza released an album entitled Freedom Over Everything in collaboration with the Czech National Symphony Orchestra. The album's title track featured guest vocals from Black Thought of The Roots. Another track from that album, "To The Edge of Longing", featured soprano Julia Bullock and garnered Mendoza the Grammy Award for Best Arrangement, Instrumental and Vocals. Mendoza works as an adjunct professor of jazz composition at USC Thornton School of Music. He is also the composer-in-residence with the WDR Big Band.

Discography

As leader

Singles

As arranger and conductor 
With the Metropole Orkest
 Bart van Lier – Twilight (Koch Jazz, 1998)
 Elvis Costello – Live with the Metropole Orkest – My Flame Burns Blue (DG, 2006)
 Trijntje Oosterhuis – The Look Of Love: Burt Bacharach Songbook (Blue Note, 2006)
 Trijntje Oosterhuis – Who'll Speak for Love: Burt Bacharach Songbook II (Blue Note, 2007)
 Trijntje Oosterhuis – Best of Burt Bacharach Live (Blue Note/EMI, 2009) – compilation
 Ivan Lins – Regência: Vince Mendoza (Biscoito Fino, 2009)
 Jim Beard – Revolutions (Sunnyside, 2009)
 Metropole Orkest / John Scofield - 54 (EmArcy, 2010)
 Chris Minh Doky / Larry Goldings / Peter Erskine – Scenes from a Dream (Red Dot, 2010)
 Al Jarreau – Al Jarreau and the Metropole Orkest Live (Concord, 2012)
 Metropole Orkest - Perfect Vision: The Esquivel Sound (Basta, 2013)
 Raul Midón – If You Really Want (Artistry Music, 2018)
 Cory Wong – Live in Amsterdam (Cory Wong, 2020)

With WDR Big Band Cologne
 Randy Brecker w/Michael Brecker – Some Skunk Funk (Telarc, 2005)
 Joe Zawinul – Brown Street (WDR/Intuition, 2006)
 Chano Domínguez – Soleando (Jazzline, 2015)
 Antonio Sánchez - Channels of Energy (Camjazz, 2018)
 Fred Hersch - Begin Again (Palmetto, 2019)
 Luciana Souza - Storytellers (Sunnyside, 2020)

With Björk
 Selmasongs (One Little Indian, 2000)
 Vespertine (One Little Indian, 2001)

With Peter Erskine
 Transition (Passport Jazz, 1986/Denon, 1987)
 Motion Poet (Denon, 1988)

With Joni Mitchell
 Both Sides Now (Reprise, 2000)
 Travelogue (Nonesuch, 2002)

With others
 Michael Brecker – Don't Try This at Home (Impulse!, 1988)
 Al Di Meola – World Sinfonia (Tomato, 1991)
 Yellowjackets – Greenhouse (MCA, 1991)
 Jimmy Haslip – Arc (GRP, 1993)
 Kyle Eastwood – From Here to There (Columbia, 1998)
 Stefano di Battista –  'Round About Roma (Blue Note, 2002)
 Yuri Honing - Symphonic (Challenge, 2006)
 Melody Gardot – My One and Only Thrill (Verve, 2009)
 Mary Chapin Carpenter - Songs from the Movie (Zoë, 2014)
 Nils Landgren with Janis Siegel, Bochumer Symphoniker, Some Other Time: A Tribute to Leonard Bernstein (ACT, 2016)
 Lang Lang - New York Rhapsody (Sony Classical, 2016)
 Gregory Porter – Nat King Cole & Me (Blue Note, 2017)
 Temple University Studio Orchestra – Constant Renaissance (BCM+D Records, 2019)
 Melody Gardot - Sunset in the Blue (Decca, 2020)
 Elvis Costello and Burt Bacharach – The Songs of Bacharach and Costello (Universal, 2023)

As instrumentalist
 Rickie Lee Jones, Flying Cowboys (Geffen, 1989)
 John Abercrombie, Animato (ECM, 1990)
 Peter Erskine, Big Theatre (Ah Um, 1996)

Awards

Grammy Awards

Latin Grammy Awards

References

External links
Official Website

1961 births
American jazz composers
American male jazz composers
American music arrangers
American male conductors (music)
Grammy Award winners
Living people
Musicians from Norwalk, Connecticut
Ohio State University alumni
ACT Music artists
Jazz musicians from Connecticut
21st-century American conductors (music)
21st-century American male musicians